Jasonville is a city in Greene County, Indiana, United States. The population was 1,966 as of the 2020 census. It is the westernmost community in the Bloomington, Indiana, Metropolitan Statistical Area, approximately 15 miles closer to Terre Haute than to Bloomington.

History 
Jasonville was founded in 1858. It was named for one of its founders, Jason Rogers.

Jasonville, Indiana, is rich in history including a big fire in 1914, a booming mining community of the past, and the establishment of Shakamak State Park.  Jasonville's motto is "Gateway to Shakamak" as Shakamak State Park is only 1 mile from the town.

Geography
Jasonville is located at  (39.161511, -87.201027).

Demographics

2010 census
As of the census of 2010, there were 2,222 people, 882 households, and 568 families living in the city. The racial makeup of the city was 98.1% White, 0.2% African American, 0.1% Native American, 0.4% Asian, 0.4% from other races, and 0.9% from two or more races. Hispanic or Latino of any race were 0.8% of the population.

There were 882 households, of which 36.3% had children under the age of 18 living with them, 44.9% were married couples living together, 13.3% had a female householder with no husband present, 6.2% had a male householder with no wife present, and 35.6% were non-families. 30.5% of all households were made up of individuals, and 17.4% had someone living alone who was 65 years of age or older. The average household size was 2.47 and the average family size was 3.05.

The median age in the city was 38.4 years. 26.7% of residents were under the age of 18; 7.4% were between the ages of 18 and 24; 24.4% were from 25 to 44; 24.5% were from 45 to 64; and 17.1% were 65 years of age or older. The gender makeup of the city was 47.4% male and 52.6% female.

2000 census
As of the census of 2000, there were 2,490 people, 970 households, and 615 families living in the city. The racial makeup of the city was 98.27% White, 0.08% African American, 0.36% Native American, 0.24% Asian, 0.20% from other races, and 0.84% from two or more races. Hispanic or Latino of any race were 1.00% of the population.

There were 970 households, out of which 33.8% had children under the age of 18 living with them, 46.5% were married couples living together, 12.4% had a female householder with no husband present, and 36.5% were non-families. 31.2% of all households were made up of individuals, and 16.0% had someone living alone who was 65 years of age or older. The average household size was 2.46 and the average family size was 3.08.

In the city, the population was spread out, with 26.1% under the age of 18, 9.4% from 18 to 24, 26.4% from 25 to 44, 20.0% from 45 to 64, and 18.1% who were 65 years of age or older. The median age was 37 years. For every 100 females, there were 88.8 males. For every 100 females age 18 and over, there were 82.5 males.

The median income for a household in the city was $23,208, and the median income for a family was $29,485. Males had a median income of $27,037 versus $18,304 for females. The per capita income for the city was $11,558. About 15.6% of families and 19.9% of the population were below the poverty line, including 26.0% of those under age 18 and 7.1% of those age 65 or over.

Education
The city has a lending library, the Jasonville Public Library.

Jasonville is also home to Shakamak Jr-Sr High School and Shakamak Elementary

References

External links
 Greene County Economic Development Corporation

Cities in Indiana
Cities in Greene County, Indiana
Bloomington metropolitan area, Indiana
1858 establishments in Indiana